The Best of Sophie B. Hawkins is a 2003 compilation album by Sophie B. Hawkins. It was released exclusively in the United States, and contains much of the same tracks as the previous year's compilation of the same name, which was released internationally. Instead, this album replaces single "Don't Don't Tell Me No", "Let Me Love You Up" and "We Are One Body" from the previous album for Whaler track "Swing from Limb to Limb (My Home Is in Your Jungle)", the Butcher mix of "As I Lay Me Down" and another single from Tongues and Tails, "Mysteries We Understand". This album has also been issued with the title Essential Sophie B. Hawkins.

The album was followed by yet another compilation, strangely released within the same year and titled after Hawkins' first single, "Damn I Wish I Was Your Lover". It collects tracks from the singer's first two albums.

Track listing
All songs written by Sophie B. Hawkins, except where noted.

"Damn I Wish I Was Your Lover" – 5:25
"California Here I Come" – 4:36
"Mysteries We Understand" – 4:48
"Before I Walk on Fire" – 4:59
"Don't Stop Swaying" – 5:28
"I Want You" (Bob Dylan) – 5:18
"Right Beside You" (Chertoff, Hawkins, Lerman) – 4:47
"As I Lay Me Down" – 4:10
"Did We Not Choose Each Other" – 4:26
"Only Love (The Ballad of Sleeping Beauty)" – 5:04
"I Need Nothing Else" – 4:16
"The Night They Drove Old Dixie Down" (Robbie Robertson) – 5:28
"Swing from Limb to Limb (My Home Is in Your Jungle)" – 4:15
"As I Lay Me Down" (Butcher Mix) – 3:52

Sophie B. Hawkins albums
2003 compilation albums
Albums produced by Stephen Lipson
Columbia Records compilation albums